Agildo Ribeiro (24 April 1932 – 28 April 2018) was a Brazilian actor.

Filmography

External links

1932 births
2018 deaths
Brazilian male actors
People from Rio de Janeiro (city)